The 2014–15 Miami Hurricanes men's basketball team represents the University of Miami during the 2014–15 NCAA Division I men's basketball season. The Hurricanes, led by fourth year head coach Jim Larrañaga, play their home games at the BankUnited Center and were members of the Atlantic Coast Conference. The team has had wins at Duke, Syracuse and Florida, all on the road. They finished the season 25–13, 10–8 in ACC play to finish in a tie for sixth place. They advanced to the quarterfinals of the ACC tournament where they lost to Notre Dame. They were invited to the National Invitation Tournament where they defeated North Carolina Central, Alabama, Richmond and Temple to advanced to the NIT championship game where they lost to Stanford.

Previous season

The Hurricanes finished the season 17–16, 7–11 in ACC play to finish in tenth place. They advanced to the second round of the ACC tournament where they lost to NC State.

Departures

Incoming transfers

2014 recruiting class

Roster

Schedule and results

|-
!colspan=12 style=| Exhibition

|-
!colspan=12 style=| Non-conference Regular Season

|-
!colspan=12 style="background:#005030; color:white;"| ACC Regular Season

|-
!colspan=12 style=| ACC tournament

|-
!colspan=12 style=| National Invitation Tournament

Rankings

References

Miami Hurricanes men's basketball seasons
Miami
MIami
Miami Hurricanes men's basketball team
Miami Hurricanes men's basketball team